Francis Jefferson Coates (August 24, 1843 – January 27, 1880) was a soldier in the Union Army during the American Civil War and one of 64 men who received the Medal of Honor for actions during the Battle of Gettysburg.

Biography
Coates was born 24 August 1843 in Grant County, Wisconsin to William Coates and Cynthia Cain. Although born in Grant County his official residence was listed as Boscobel, Wisconsin.

Coates joined the Union Army on 29 August 1861 (a few days after his 18th birthday), and served with the 7th Wisconsin Infantry. He was wounded while fighting in the Battle of South Mountain and during the Battle of Gettysburg where he received the Medal of Honor and a brevet promotion to Captain for courage in battle.  During the Battle of Gettysburg he was shot in the face, causing him to lose both of his eyes. He was mustered out for disability on September 1, 1864 at the end of his term of service.

Despite having become completely blind, Coates learned how to make brooms after the war and married Rachael Sarah Drew April 21, 1867. Together they had five children and sometime between 1870 and 1873, they moved to Dorchester, Nebraska.

He died of pneumonia in Dorchester, Nebraska January 27, 1880 and is buried in Dorchester Cemetery in Dorchester.

Legacy
The Jefferson Coates County Campus for the Missouri School for the Blind was named after Coates.

Medal of Honor citation
Citation:
For extraordinary heroism on 1 July 1863, while serving with Company H, 7th Wisconsin Infantry, in action at Gettysburg, Pennsylvania, for unsurpassed courage in battle, where he had both eyes shot out.

See also

List of Medal of Honor recipients for the Battle of Gettysburg
List of American Civil War Medal of Honor recipients: A–F

References

External links

1843 births
1880 deaths
People from Saline County, Nebraska
People from Boscobel, Wisconsin
Union Army officers
United States Army Medal of Honor recipients
American Civil War recipients of the Medal of Honor
People of Wisconsin in the American Civil War
American blind people
Deaths from pneumonia in Nebraska